Schriever is the name of several places in the United States:

 Schriever, Louisiana, census-designated place named for John G. Schriever (see below)
 Schriever (Amtrak station)
 Schriever Township, South Dakota
 Schriever Air Force Base, a US military base near Colorado Springs, Colorado, named after General Schriever (see below)

People with the surname
 Bernard Adolph Schriever (1910-2005), US Air Force general 
 Erich Schriever, Swiss rower
 Jacob Schriever, Dutch fencer
 John George Schriever (1844-1898), American railroad official, resident of New Orleans

See also
 Schriever-Habermohl
 Schreiber (surname)